Amy Turner may refer to:
 Amy Turner (rugby, born March 1984), New Zealand-born semi-professional Australian rugby league and rugby union player
 Amy Turner (rugby union, born July 1984), English rugby union player
 Amy Turner (footballer) (born 1991), English association footballer
 Amy Turner (rower), American rower